Ramshar is a new planned city located in the Sistan area south of Zabol in the Sistan and Baluchestan province of Iran.

Populated places in Sistan and Baluchestan Province
Cities in Sistan and Baluchestan Province